Irja is a given name. Notable people with the given name include:

Irja Askola (born 1952), Finnish bishop in the Evangelical Lutheran Church of Finland
Irja Agnes Browallius (1901–1968), Swedish teacher, novelist and short story writer
Irja Hagfors (1905–1988), Finnish dance artist, choreographer and dance teacher
Irja Ketonen (1921–1988), Finnish media executive
Irja Koikson (born 1980), Estonian footballer
Irja Lipasti (1905–2000), Finnish sprinter
Irja Seurujärvi-Kari (born 1947), Finnish Sámi politician and academic

See also
Papua (province)

Finnish feminine given names